Teo Tuvale (26 August 1855 – December 1919) was a notable Samoan historian who served terms as Chief Justice and Secretary to Government in Samoa during the era of colonialism.

Tuvale is the author of An account of Samoan History up to 1918, a key historical text in Samoan history which includes first hand accounts of the rivalry between European colonial powers and Samoan chiefly families. He was also an official translator and spoke English, German and some Fijian.

Background
Tuvale was born in Faleasiu village on the north coast of Upolu island. His father was Vaaelua Petaia (1822–1881), one of the first Samoan Christian converts to the London Missionary Society and the first pastor of Faleasiu. Following in his father's footsteps, Tuvale attended the seminary at Malua village in 1875. The Malua Theological College had been established in 1844. He taught at the Malua training school in 1877. An older brother with the family's matai chief title of Le Mamea Makalau was a Samoan official in the government and helped him to get work in the administration. In 1878, he was appointed assistant secretary to the official indigenous Samoa government based at the village of Mulinu'u. He held successive positions through different colonial regimes. He spent some years in Fiji where he became friends with Fiji's paramount chief Ratu Cakobau. In 1900, he led a group of traditional dancers to Germany where he met the Kaiser. He was a translator for Wilhelm Solf, the German governor in Samoa.

He also worked as a government translator, and wrote the historical account in 1918 at the behest of Colonel Robert Logan, the commander of the British Military Occupation.

Historian
Tuvale's historical works included detailed recordings of Samoan architecture, genealogies (gafa), fa'a Samoa, culture, language and ceremonies.

Tuvale writes in the introduction of An Account of Samoan History up to 1918;

Tuvale also helped two brothers compile another important historical document Tusi Fa'alupega (Samoan ceremonial greetings in oratory) which was given to the London Missionary Society.

Death
Tuvale's last job was supervising the burial of the dead during the 1918 flu epidemic which killed an estimated 22% (8,500) of Samoa's population. He died in December 1919, immediately following the epidemic. He is buried in Faleasiu.

Descendants
Tuvale is the grandfather of Samoan author, educator and professor Peggy Fairbairn-Dunlop.

References

An Account of Samoa History up to 1918 At NZ Electronic Text Centre, CC-BY-SA 3.0 NZ Licence. Retrieved 16 November 2009

Samoan writers
1855 births
1919 deaths
Samoan historians
Historians of the Pacific
People from A'ana
Mataʻafa family